Parker D. Price-Miller (born May 2, 1998) is an American professional dirt track racing driver who competes full-time in the World of Outlaws for PPM Racing. Price-Miller made his NASCAR Camping World Truck Series debut in the No. 3 Chevrolet Silverado for Jordan Anderson Racing at the 2021 Corn Belt 150 at Knoxville Raceway. Price-Miller is also referred to by his nickname "The Law Firm".

In October of 2021, Price-Miller announced he was diagnosed with B-cell lymphoma, the most common form of Non-Hodgkin's lymphoma.

Motorsports career results

NASCAR
(key) (Bold – Pole position awarded by qualifying time. Italics – Pole position earned by points standings or practice time. * – Most laps led.)

Camping World Truck Series

 Season still in progress
 Ineligible for series points

References

External links
 

1998 births
Living people
People from Kokomo, Indiana
NASCAR drivers
Racing drivers from Indiana
World of Outlaws drivers